Molly Anne Taylor (born 6 May 1988 in Sydney) is an Australian rally car driver. She is the 2016 Australian Rally Champion, the first and only woman to win the Australian Rally Championship and the youngest regardless of gender, and the 2021 Extreme E Champion.

She was the first female accepted into the Australian Motor Sports Foundation (AMSF) International Rising Star Program and also awarded the New South Wales (NSW) Confederation of Australian Motorsport Young Achiever of the Year Award in 2006. In 2011, she was part of the World Rally Championship Pirelli Star Driver program and one of the youngest and the only female driver participating in the WRC. She has won several championships including back to back Australian Rally Championships in the F16 Class for 2007 and 2008. In 2009, she became the British Ladies Rally Champion, the first ever driver from outside of the United Kingdom to win the title, which she won again in 2010. She also competed in the FIA 2013 European Rally Championship. In 2016, Taylor won the Australian Rally Championship overall classification.

Early life and education

Taylor is the daughter of rally driver Mark Taylor and four-time Australian Rally Champion co-driver Coral Taylor. Molly has one sister, Jane. Molly attended New England Girls' School in Northern New South Wales. She had a love of horses growing up and competed in cross-country events. While attending school, her focus was on equestrian events where she competed in national level events. Taylor sold her horse in order to purchase her first rally car. She was quoted as saying, "I got 100 horsepower for one horse so I thought that was pretty good."

After attaining a Universities Admissions Index of 98/100, Taylor commenced a Bachelor of Commerce at the University of Sydney. She left university to pursue rallying full time. She also has a Certificate in Automotive Studies and is a qualified personal trainer.

Career

Early career pre-2010

While working with her father at his rally school, Taylor was offered a car to compete in some local motorkhanas where she took first in class and placed ninth outright. It was during her time at the rally school with her father teaching her to be a safe driver that she decided to pursue a career in rallying.

In 2006, Taylor was selected into the Women's Driver Development program where she was considered a standout performer. The same year she upgraded from a Holden Gemini and won her first outing in her new car by a full five minutes. She was recognized as the New South Wales Young Achiever of the year by CAMS after winning the 2006 New South Wales Rally Championship, taking both the 2WD and 2-Litre titles. She used 2006 as a year to gain experience in a rear-wheel drive rally car before moving into a front-wheel drive car and moving up to the Australian Rally Championship.

Taylor debuted in the Australian Rally Championship in 2007 where she won the F16 class, a feat she repeated in 2008. She moved to the United Kingdom a year later in order to compete in the Suzuki Swift Sport Cup, where she won three out of her six races and became the British Ladies Rally Champion.  In 2009 and 2010 she was selected for the Australian Motor Sport Foundation International Rising Star program.

2010–2016

While driving in the British Rally Championship, she was noticed by Pirelli and World Racing Championship Academy officials. She was then invited to participate in the Pirelli Star Driver Shootout where she competed against sixteen of the top young drivers in rally racing from throughout the world. Based on her performance at the Shootout, she was awarded one of only six scholarships to the FIA World Rally Championship Academy, which allowed her to compete in the World Rally Championship in 2011. The scholarship allowed her to participate in six events for the World Rally Championship with all of her racing expenses paid. She finished the final race of the championship at the Wales Rally Great Britain with a stage win, also winning the Richard Burns Trophy for the season.

Taylor also competed in the FIA European Championship in 2013. She also competed for the first ever FIA European Rally Championship ladies trophy.

In 2015, she became the first woman to win a heat in the Australian Rally Championship in heat one of the opening event in Western Australia, and then the first woman to win an event outright at the National Capital Rally in Canberra.  Molly achieved podium positions at every Championship round and finished second overall in the Championship. She was also invited to take part in a 1000 km Endurance Race in Lithuania where her team finished third in their class.

She was awarded the Peter Brock Medal, one of the most prestigious awards in Australian motorsport, awarded to the driver who has demonstrated similar characteristics to the late Peter Brock AM, including outstanding ability, a fair and sportsman-like attitude and a willingness and capacity to promote the sport in the wider community.

In 2016, she became both the first female driver to win the Australian Rally Championship and the youngest to do so at the time, with co-driver Bill Hayes.

2017–2019

A strong start to the 2017 season and consistent performance throughout the year put Taylor in a strong position for a consecutive back-to-back victory, but an engine failure during the final round in Coffs Harbour pushed Taylor and new co-driver Malcolm Read to second overall, handing the outright win to Nathan Quinn.

It was another crushing finish to the year for Taylor in 2018 when, once again, her Coffs Harbour weekend was brought to an early conclusion following a spectacular crash during the second stage. Taylor and Read escaped unharmed despite a significant impact that caused their Les Walkden Subaru WRX STI to catch fire.

For the 2019 season, Taylor and Read entered the ARC with an all-new AP4 WRX STI built and supported by Orange Motorsport Engineering. It was to be a challenging year with persistent mechanical problems and a serious crash in Ballarat punctuated by successes but, once again, the season would conclude under unusual circumstances. The penultimate Adelaide Hills round – and subsequently the 2018 season – was won by championship favourite Harry Bates, finishing day two and more than 97 kilometres ahead of Taylor by just two tenths of a second. Bates secured the overall victory on points for the Neal Bates Motorsport Toyota team at the penultimate round, ahead of the final round in Coffs Harbour. The Subaru do Motorsport team finished third overall for the season.

However, the 2019 Australian bushfire crisis lead to the cancellation of the Coffs Harbour round and an early finish for the 2019 tour.
It was the final year in Subaru Australia's contract with Taylor and a four-year commitment to the ARC, and the carmaker did not return for the 2020 championship.

In 2019, Taylor also made her series circuit racing debut, competing in the TCR Australia championship. As part of the Kelly Racing TCR team, Taylor raced one of two Subaru WRX TCR cars entered into the championship but ARC commitments meant she was only able to compete in five of the season's seven races.

2019–present

Following Subaru's exit from the Australian Rally Championship, Taylor had planned to compete in a number of rounds of the 2020 American Rally Association championship in a DirtFish Limited Subaru WRX STI, but the impact of the COVID-19 pandemic put an hiatus on her ARA assault. Taylor continues as a brand ambassador for Subaru Australia.

In 2020, it was announced Taylor would be participating the Seven Network's reality program SAS Australia.

In May 2020, Taylor joined the driver program of the inaugural Extreme E international electric rally series, which commenced in 2021. She partners Johan Kristoffersson at the Rosberg X Racing team. The pair won three of the five rounds of the season on their way to becoming the series' first champions. Despite winning the championship, she was replaced by Mikaela Åhlin-Kottulinsky for the 2022 season. Taylor joined JBXE for the 2022 Desert X-Prix, sharing the car with Kevin Hansen on a one-race deal.

Career rally record

 2021 – Extreme E – overall champion
 2017 – Australian Rally Championship – runner up
 2016 – Australian Rally Championship – overall champion
 2016 – Twilight Rallysprint Series – 37th in Round 1
 2015 – Australian Rally Championship – runner up; awarded Peter Brock Medal
 2013 – FIA ERC Ladies Rally Champion
 2012 – Signed With United Business Rally Management, Selected World & European Rally Championship Events
 2011 – Pirelli Star Driver – World Rally Championship Academy
 2010 – British Ladies Rally Champion, 3rd Citroën Racing Trophy (BRC), IRDC Most Improved Award
 2009 – British Ladies Rally Champion, Greenlight TV Star Performer Award
 2008 – F16 Champion, Australian Rally Championship
 2007 – F16 Champion, Australian Rally Championship
 2006 – 2WD Champion, NSW Rally Championship
 2006 – 2 Litre Champion, NSW Rally Championship

Complete World Rally Championship results

* Season still in progress.

Complete Extreme E results
(key)

* Season still in progress.

Career circuit racing record

Complete Bathurst 12 Hour results

TCR Australia results

See also
 2008 Australian Rally Championship
 List of female World Rally Championship drivers

References

External links
 Molly Taylor Official Website
 Molly Taylor Twitter
 Molly Taylor Instagram
 Profile at ewrc-results.com

Living people
1988 births
Australian rally drivers
Female rally drivers
University of Sydney alumni
Australian female racing drivers
World Rally Championship drivers
Extreme E drivers
Team Rosberg drivers
Kelly Racing drivers
Dakar Rally drivers